8 is a number, numeral, and glyph.

8 or eight may also refer to:

Years
 AD 8, the eighth year of the AD era
 8 BC, the eighth year before the AD era

Art
The Eight (Ashcan School), a group of twentieth century painters associated with the Ashcan School
The Eight (painters), an avant-garde art movement of Hungarian painters

Motor vehicles
Bentley Eight, Bentley's "entry-level" offering from 1984 until 1992  
Leyland Eight, a luxury car produced by Leyland Motors from 1920 to 1923
Mercury Eight, a first Post War Mercury car design
Morris Eight, a small car inspired by the Ford Model Y
Standard Eight, a small car produced by Standard Motor Company 1938–59
Wolseley Eight, a four-door, light saloon car produced by Wolseley Motors Limited from 1946 to 1948
Straight eight, automobile engine
Eight cylinder, automobile engine

Sports
Eight (rowing), rowing boat used in the sport of competitive rowing
Figure 8 (belay device), rock climbing equipment also known as an "eight"

Transportation
8 (New York City Subway service), designation given to several IRT services
8 (Los Angeles Railway), a line operated by the Los Angeles Railway
Eighth Avenue (Brooklyn), a major street in Brooklyn, New York City
Eighth Avenue (Manhattan), a major avenue in Manhattan, New York City
List of highways numbered 8
List of public transport routes numbered 8

Film, TV, and theatre 
8 (2008 film), an anthology of eight short films
8: The Mormon Proposition, a 2010 American documentary film
8 (upcoming film), an upcoming Indian Tamil film
Eight (1998 film), a British short film directed by Stephen Daldry
Channel 8 (disambiguation), several television stations
8 (play), a 2011 play about California's Proposition 8 by Dustin Lance Black
Eight (play), the first play written by Ella Hickson

Literature
The Eight (novel), an American author Katherine Neville's first novel

Music
Eight (Japanese band), a Japanese metal band
Eight (Korean band), stylized as 8Eight, a South Korean pop group

Albums
8 (Anggun album), 2017
8 (Arvingarna album), 2005
8 (2008), an album by Bo Kaspers Orkester
8 (Do As Infinity video), a 2004 video album
8 (Gian Marco Zignago album), 2006
8 (Hunter EP), 2009
8 (Incubus album), 2017
8 (J. J. Cale album), 1983
8 (Kekal album), 2011
8 (Luis Fonsi album), 2014
8 (Shea Couleé album), 2023
8 (Spinners album), 1977
8 (Statik Selektah album), 2017
Eight (Do As Infinity album), 2011
Eight (New Model Army album), 2000
Ei8ht (album), a 2012 album by Nik Kershaw

Songs
"8 Ball" by Herb Alpert, 1985
"Eight", a song by Karma to Burn from the album Wild, Wonderful Purgatory, 1999
"8" by Billie Eilish, 2019
"Eight (song)" by IU featuring Suga, 2020

Typography 
8, the X-SAMPA symbol for the close-mid central rounded vowel, equivalent to the IPA symbol 
8, a common substitute for the ou-ligature ȣ
8, a letter in the Old Italic script (𐌚) with the value /f/

Other uses
8, numerical symbol for the month of August
8, the number used on a seven-segment display
Windows 8, an operating system by Microsoft
Eight, West Virginia, an unincorporated community

See also
Eighth (disambiguation)
Number Eight (disambiguation)
Eights (disambiguation)
08 (disambiguation)
8 Mile (disambiguation)
8S (disambiguation)
8tv (disambiguation)
1/8 (disambiguation)
Octet (disambiguation)
V8 (disambiguation)
The 8th (disambiguation)
Figure 8 (disambiguation)
Infinity symbol, ∞, a mathematical symbol
Lemniscate, a figure-eight-shaped curve